The Portrait of Cosimo I de' Medici is a painting by the Italian artist Agnolo di Cosimo, known as Bronzino, finished in 1545. 
In his position as court painter for the Medici, Bronzino was author of several portraits of Grand Duke Cosimo I de' Medici. In this portrait, Cosimo is represented in his younger years, commanding and proud; and to quote Giorgio Vasari, "clad with white armor and a hand over the helmet". It has been identified as having been painted in the Medicis' Villa of Poggio a Caiano in 1545.

Bronzino's portrait captures Duke Cosimo I following a great diplomatic triumph. Cosimo had, at long last, rid Florence of the Spanish garrisons that had been stationed there since the early 1530s, when Pope Clement VII (Giulio de' Medici) and Holy Roman Emperor Charles V agreed that Florence would become an Imperial duchy, governed by the Medici. Charles V stationed the garrisons in Florence ostensibly to protect its first duke, Alessandro de Medici, from those who might rise up against him or otherwise do him harm. Cosimo I however chaffed under the watch of the Spanish troops, and in 1543, in return for a monetary payment to Charles V, (the latter needed funds to fight Protestants in Northern Europe), the duke obtained the evacuation of the garrisons stationed in Florence.

Bronzino painted about 25 only slightly differing versions of the portrait.

List of works

References
Artnet.it: Portrait of Cosimo I de' Medici—
Robert B. Simon, Bronzino's Portrait of Cosimo I in Armour The Burlington Magazine, 1983, p. 527–537, 539.

Medici, Cosimo 1
Medici, Cosimo 1
1545 paintings
Medici, Cosimo 1
Medici, Cosimo 1
Medici, Cosimo 1
Paintings by Bronzino in the Uffizi